Griga is a surname. Notable people with the surname include:

Larisa Griga (born 1984), Ukrainian badminton player
Stanislav Griga (born 1961), Slovak footballer and manager

See also
Griga United, Belizean football team
Grigas